Daniel D'Alvise (born December 13, 1955) is a Canadian former ice hockey player. He was a member of Team Canada at the 1980 Winter Olympics. He scored three goals and three assists in six games, including a game tying goal in a closely-fought 4–6 loss to the USSR.

Prior to the Olympics, he played with the Toronto Varsity Blues, and later with HC Merano of the Italian Hockey League.

His son, Chris D'Alvise, is also a professional hockey player. His older brother, Bob D'Alvise, played in the World Hockey Association with the Toronto Toros. After his hockey career, he became a rink manager in Etobicoke.

References

External links

Canadian Olympic Committee

1955 births
Living people
Canadian ice hockey centres
Ice hockey players at the 1980 Winter Olympics
Olympic ice hockey players of Canada
Ice hockey people from Toronto
Toronto Maple Leafs draft picks
Toronto Planets players